Philip Donald Johnson (born September 6, 1941) is a former college basketball player and a former basketball coach.  He played college basketball at Utah State University and Weber State, and has coached collegiately at Weber State University.

Early life and college playing career
Philip Donald Johnson, a native of Grace, Idaho, graduated from Grace High School in 1959. He attended Utah State University for one year before transferring to Weber College (now Weber State University) in Ogden, Utah, where he played on the Wildcats basketball team for one season. In 1961, Johnson returned to Utah State University and played two years on the Utah State Aggies basketball team. Playing under coach LaDell Andersen, Johnson was part of Utah State teams that made the NCAA tournaments of 1962 and 1963. Johnson averaged 12.3 points and 7.1 rebounds in his senior season and graduated from Utah State in 1963 with a B.S. in physical education, and in 1964 he completed his master's degree.

Coaching career
Johnson began his coaching career in the 1963–64 season as the freshman basketball team coach at Utah State. In 1964, Johnson returned to his junior college alma mater, by then Weber State College, as an assistant coach under Dick Motta. In four seasons with Johnson as an assistant, Weber State finished at the top of the Big Sky Conference in 1965, 1966, and 1968 and made the 1968 NCAA Tournament.

In 1968, Johnson became head coach at Weber State. In three seasons with Johnson as head coach, Weber State was Big Sky regular season champions every season and made every NCAA tournament from 1969 to 1971. The Big Sky also recognized Johnson as Coach of the Year in those seasons, as well. Johnson left Weber State with a 68-16 record.

In his first NBA coaching job, Johnson again joined Dick Motta's coaching staff in 1971 with the Chicago Bulls. On November 29, 1973, the Kansas City-Omaha Kings hired Johnson as new head coach after firing Bob Cousy. Inheriting a 6–19 team, Johnson went 27–31 for the rest of the season, and the Kings finished 33–49. The following season, Johnson led the Kings a 44–38 record and a berth in the 1975 NBA Playoffs. For this achievement, Johnson earned the 1975 NBA Coach of the Year Award. Johnson was fired on January 7, 1978, following a 13–24 start for the now Kansas City Kings.

In 1979, Johnson returned to the Chicago Bulls, this time as an assistant coach on Jerry Sloan's staff. When Sloan was fired, Phil completed the year as Rod Thorn's assistant.

On July 20, 1982, Johnson joined Frank Layden's staff on the Utah Jazz and would serve as an assistant coach for two seasons.

On November 30, 1984, the Kansas City Kings hired Johnson as head coach, after Jack McKinney resigned following a 1–8 start. The Kings finished the 1984–85 season 31–51. The Kings then moved to Sacramento, California, and Johnson coached the Kings' first two seasons in Sacramento. The team made the playoffs the first season. Following a 14–32 start, in the second year, the Kings fired Johnson on February 9, 1987. This was the second time the team fired Johnson from the head coaching position.

Johnson was an assistant coach with the Utah Jazz from December 11, 1988 until his resignation on February 10, 2011. During his stint with the Jazz, he was named the NBA's top assistant coach four times by an annual survey of NBA general managers (2002, 2004, 2007, 2010).

In 1992, Johnson was inducted into the Weber State University Sports Hall of Fame. In 2011, he was inducted into the Utah Sports Hall of Fame. On July 12, 2016, Johnson was awarded the inaugural Tex Winter Assistant Coach Lifetime Impact Award by the NBA Coach's Association. Utah State University inducted him into the Athletic Hall of Fame on September 4, 2016.

Johnson and his wife, Ann, are the parents of two children, Mitchel and Nathan, and have two grandchildren, McKenna and Alexander. They reside in suburban Salt Lake City.

References

External links
 NBA.com coach file: Phil Johnson
 Basketball-Reference.com: Phil Johnson

1941 births
Living people
American men's basketball coaches
American men's basketball players
Basketball coaches from Idaho
Basketball players from Idaho
Chicago Bulls head coaches
Junior college men's basketball players in the United States
Kansas City Kings head coaches
Kansas City-Omaha Kings head coaches
People from Grace, Idaho
Utah Jazz assistant coaches
Utah State Aggies men's basketball players
Weber State Wildcats men's basketball coaches